Lawangeen Abdulrahimzai (born 2001) is an Afghan man who murdered three men; two in Serbia and one in the United Kingdom.
Lawangeen Abdulrahimzai was born in Afghanistan in 2001. From 2015, he moved illegally through many international borders, initially through Pakistan and Iran before moving between Norway, Italy and Serbia. On 31 July 2018, he used a Kalashnikov rifle to shoot dead two Afghan men, for which he was convicted in absentia of two counts of murder. In 2019 he made a claim for asylum in Norway. During December 2019, it was rejected; during the same month he illegally entered the United Kingdom, where he claimed asylum, pretending to be an unaccompanied 14-year-old. He moved to Poole, Dorset, England, where he was put into foster care. On 12 March 2022, he stabbed stranger Tom Roberts to death in the street in Bournemouth, Dorset, England. Abdulrahimzai admitted manslaughter, but denied murder. In January 2023, he was tried at Salisbury Crown Court in Wiltshire, where on 23 January he was convicted of murder. On 25 January, the same court sentenced him to life imprisonment with a minimum of 29 years.

References

2001 births
Living people
21st-century criminals
Afghan emigrants to the United Kingdom
Afghan people convicted of murder
Crime in Dorset
Date of birth missing (living people)
Male murderers
Murder in England
Murder in Serbia
People convicted of murder by England and Wales
People convicted of murder by Serbia